Peter Vanacker (born 1966) is the current CEO of LyondellBasell. Previously he was president and CEO of the Finnish oil and renewal energy company Neste. He was appointed in February 2018 and started his tenure on 1 November of same year. Previously he served as the CEO and Managing Director of CABB Group GmbH.

Vanacker has Belgian and German citizenships.

Education
MSc, Chemical Engineering, Polymers Engineering, University of Ghent

Career 
Vanacker served about 10 years as a member of the executive committee, and served in executive roles at Bayer MaterialScience. After Bayer he was the CEO of Treofan Group. 

From 2015 to 2018, Vanacker was the CEO and Managing Director of CABB Group GmbH.

References

1966 births
Living people
Belgian chief executives
German chief executives
Ghent University alumni
Businesspeople in the oil industry
Belgian expatriates in Finland
German expatriates in Finland
Neste people